The Good Heart is an Icelandic independent film written and directed by Dagur Kári, starring Brian Cox and Paul Dano. It debuted at the 2009 Toronto International Film Festival.

Plot 
Short-tempered bartender Jacques (Brian Cox) has a heart-attack. Young homeless man Lucas (Paul Dano) fails in a suicide attempt. They share a room in the hospital. Jacques becomes obsessed with helping Lucas, even snooping through his medical records before finally tracking him down. Reluctantly, Lucas agrees to come to the bar, and Lucas is given a sparsely furnished room. Jacques trains Lucas as a bartender, where Lucas resists Jacques’ cynicism and belittling of the customers. Jacques wishes to coach Lucas to become his successor, but feels that Lucas is too soft toward guests.

Lucas allows April (Isild Le Besco) to stay in his room, but Jacques tells Lucas that he should send her away. However, Lucas and April get married and both leave. Reluctantly Jacques allows April to come back, because he finds it important that the bar will stay after his retirement or death, and therefore that his intended successor Lucas stays.

Lucas is jealous about April's interaction with guests, and they break up. Jacques gets softer and Lucas less so. Lucas is killed after being hit by a car. His heart goes to Jacques, who has been waiting for a donor for a heart transplant. Although he always refused to sell his bar, he does so now, and starts living in the tropics, where he has friends who supplied the coffee for his bar.

Cast
 Brian Cox as Jacques
 Paul Dano as Lucas
 Stéphanie Szostak as Sarah
 Isild Le Besco as April
 Nicolas Bro as Ib Dolby

Reception
Review aggregator Rotten Tomatoes gives the film an approval rating of 30%, based on 37 reviews, with an average rating of 4.5/10. On Metacritic, the film has a weighted average score of 40 out of 100, based on 19 critics, indicating "mixed or average reviews".

Box office
The film received a domestic total of $20,930 in the United States, and in other countries, the movie received a total $322,888, making the total movie box office $343,818 worldwide.

References

External links
 
 
 
 
 
 

2009 films
English-language French films
English-language Icelandic films
Films directed by Dagur Kári
French independent films
Icelandic independent films
2000s English-language films
2000s French films